Phoebe cava is a species of beetle in the family Cerambycidae. It was described by Ernst Friedrich Germar in 1824. It is known from Brazil.

References

Hemilophini
Beetles described in 1824